Michael McQueen may refer to:

 Mike McQueen (journalist) (?–2009), American journalist
 Mike McQueen (baseball) (1950–2017), former baseball pitcher

See also
Michael Sperberg-McQueen, American markup specialist